Eboli is a railway station in Eboli, Italy. The station is located on the Battipaglia–Metaponto railway. The train services are operated by Trenitalia.

Train services
The station is served by the following service(s):

Intercity services Rome - Naples - Salerno - Taranto
Regional services (Treno regionale) Naples - Salerno - Potenza - Metaponto - Taranto

References

This article is based upon a translation of the Italian language version as at June 2014.

Railway stations in Campania
Buildings and structures in the Province of Salerno
Railway stations opened in 1863